Wythenshawe Hospital is a proposed tram stop in Wythenshawe, Greater Manchester. It would serve the hospital with the same name. It has been proposed since the early 2000s but was dropped in 2005 from the Manchester Airport Line on cost grounds.

References

Proposed Manchester Metrolink tram stops